The Nebraska Cornhuskers men's basketball team represents the University of Nebraska–Lincoln in the Big Ten Conference of NCAA Division I. The program's first year of competition was 1897, and NU has since compiled an all-time record of 1,535–1,417, with seven NCAA tournament and sixteen NIT appearances. The team has been coached by Fred Hoiberg since 2019.

Nebraska did not make the NCAA Tournament until 1986 and remains the only major-conference program to have never won a tournament game. Prior to the creation of the NCAA Tournament, Nebraska was a Midwest power under head coaches R. G. Clapp and Ewald O. Stiehm; the retroactive Premo-Porretta Power Poll ranked the Cornhuskers in the top ten three times between 1897 and 1903. Much of the team's modest modern-day success came during the fourteen-year tenure of Danny Nee, Nebraska's all-time winningest head coach. Nee led the Cornhuskers to five of their seven NCAA Tournament appearances and six NIT bids, including the 1996 NIT championship, NU's only national postseason title. After Nee was fired in 2000, head coaches Barry Collier, Doc Sadler, and Tim Miles combined to take the Cornhuskers to the NCAA Tournament just once in nineteen seasons. Miles was fired in 2019 and Nebraska hired former Chicago Bulls head coach Fred Hoiberg.

History

Early years

As near as can be determined, Nebraska was first represented by a men's basketball team on Feb. 2, 1897, six years after the invention of the sport by James Naismith. The Nebraska "Bugeaters" defeated a team from the Lincoln YMCA 11–8 at Grant Memorial Hall, which was located on the site of the current Sheldon Museum of Art and served as NU's primary home venue for all but two seasons until the Nebraska Coliseum opened in 1926. NU faced another university for the first time in 1899, winning games against Nebraska Wesleyan and Doane to claim the unofficial state championship. Nebraska, by then known as the "Cornhuskers", played an out-of-state opponent for the first time the following season, defeating James Naismith and Kansas 48–8 in what is still the worst loss in KU history. NU's 1900 team was retroactively ranked second nationally by the Premo-Porretta Power Poll.

{{In 1911, Ewald O. Stiehm, NU's fiery football coach, became the school's first full-time basketball coach. His first team won fourteen of fifteen games; the student newspaper blamed the only loss on Nebraska's inability to adjust to Minnesota's 100-foot floor. Under Stiehm, Nebraska won or shared the MVIAA championship in 1912, 1913, and 1914, and guard Sam Carrier became Nebraska's first All-American. After the 1916 football season, Stiehm was offered $4,500 annually to take over as football coach and athletic director at Indiana; despite suggesting he'd remain at Nebraska for less money, the school refused to offer him a raise and Stiehm left. Nebraska won another conference title in 1916, after Sam Waugh replaced Stiehm as the Cornhuskers' coach for a single season. Waugh was succeeded by E.J. Stewart, whose three Cornhusker teams had a combined record of 29–23. Nebraska went 22–2 in 1919–20 and 11–3 in 1920–21 under P.J. Schissler. After the 1920 season, Schissler challenged the University of Chicago to a postseason game, but the offer was declined. The Cornhuskers were invited to a postseason AAU tournament in Atlanta, but didn't participate. }}

Athletic director Fred Leuhring arranged for Nebraska to play its home basketball games in 1921 at the State Fairgrounds Coliseum, which had a wider court and more seating capacity than Grant Hall. Nebraska's first game at the Fairgrounds was a 31–10 win over Grinnell on January 14, 1921, with a crowd of 1,500 in attendance. After two seasons, the Cornhuskers returned to a remodeled Grant Hall and played there until 1926, when the school finished construction on the $445,000 Nebraska Coliseum. The Coliseum's seating capacity of 8,000 nearly quadrupled that of Grant Hall. The Cornhuskers lost 25–14 to Kansas in the first game at their new home on February 6, 1926.

After ending the decade with an 11–5 season under former Kansas All-American Charles T. Black, Nebraska had just two winning seasons over the following nineteen years, one of which was a Big Six championship in 1937. The 1930s produced four more Cornhusker All-Americans: Don Maclay in 1931, Steve Hokuf in 1933, George Wahlquist in 1936, and Robert Parsons in 1937. Maclay was the Big Six's scoring leader in 1930, scoring 112 points in ten league games.

Harry Good (1946–53)

Harry Good was hired as head coach in 1946, and after two losing seasons he turned Nebraska's fortunes around. In 1948–49, Good's Huskers went 16–10, tied Oklahoma for the Big Seven championship and defeated the Sooners in a conference playoff to qualify for an NCAA berth. The Cornhuskers lost 52–35 to MVC champion Oklahoma A&M 52–35, which finished runner-up to Adolph Rupp's Kentucky Wildcats. In 1949–50, Nebraska again won sixteen games and shared the Big Seven title with Kansas and Kansas State, NU's most recent regular season conference championship. Claude Retherford and Bus Whitehead were named all-conference performers in 1949, and Whitehead earned the honor again the next year. The 6-ft 11-in. Whitehead averaged a then-school-record 15.7 points per game in 1950 and was the first Cornhusker selected to play in the East-West All-Star Game at Madison Square Garden. When he graduated, Whitehead held nine school scoring records. This period of relative prosperity was followed with fifteen consecutive losing seasons. Despite playing for a team that finished last in the Big Seven, Husker guard Jim Buchanan earned All-America and all-conference honors in 1952.

Jerry Bush (1954–63)

Jerry Bush, dubbed the "Big Bear of the Coliseum," never produced a winning team in his nine seasons at Nebraska, and never finished higher than fourth in conference play. Nevertheless, his colorful personality and uncanny ability to fashion upsets kept Cornhuskers fans entertained. The most dramatic of these upsets came against No. 4 Kansas in 1958. The Jayhawks defeated the Cornhuskers 102–46 earlier in the year, with star center Wilt Chamberlain single-handedly matching Nebraska's forty-six points. In the rematch, guard Jim Kubacki hit a jump shot with two seconds remaining to give Nebraska a 43–41 win. Kubacki started the game out with a knee injury, but when team captain Gary Reimers hurt his leg with seven minutes remaining, Kubacki convinced Bush to let him suit up.

Bush coached the school's first 1,000-point scorer, Indianapolis native Herschell Turner, who was rated the second-best high school player in the state as a senior, behind only Oscar Robertson. Turner earned All-America honors in 1959 and followed with All-Big Eight honors in 1960 and ended his collegiate career with 1,056 points.

Joe Cipriano (1963–80)

In March 1963, Bush was replaced as head coach by thirty-one-year-old Joe Cipriano. Nebraska athletic director Tippy Dye had coached Cipriano at Washington, where they led the Huskies to the 1953 Final Four and a 79–15 record during the energetic Cipriano's varsity career. Following graduation, he served as an assistant coach at his alma mater until he was hired by Idaho in 1960. His Vandals improved in each of his three seasons and posted a 20–6 record in 1962–63, led by future Basketball Hall of Famer Gus Johnson. "Slippery Joe" brought an up-tempo style of basketball to the Coliseum; his Nebraska teams ran a full-court press and fast-break offense, which led the Big Eight in scoring average in 1966, 1967, and 1968.

Cipriano's first two teams struggled to a combined record of 17–33. But his third team, in 1965–66, was one of the most successful in school history, finishing 20–5 and second to Kansas in the Big Eight. However, that was not enough to garner a postseason bid, as only the conference champion was guaranteed a berth in the twenty-two-team NCAA tournament.

The 1966–67 team finished 16–9 and made the school's first postseason appearance, in the fourteen-team NIT at Madison Square Garden. Guard Stu Lantz, a two-time All-Big Eight selection, led the Cornhuskers in scoring and rebounding in both 1966–67 and 1967–68. Guard Marvin Stewart and center Chuck Jura earned All-Big Eight honors in 1971 and 1972, respectively. Guard Jerry Fort, who finished his career with a then-school record 1,882 points, was the first Nebraska player chosen first-team all-conference three times. Led by Cipriano and Fort, Nebraska began a string of fourteen consecutive winning seasons.

In the fall of 1976, NU basketball moved out of the Coliseum and into the state-of the-art NU Sports Complex (now the Bob Devaney Sports Center), located on the State Fairgrounds. The $13 million athletic complex was financed by a special cigarette tax.

Cipriano coached Nebraska to another twenty-victory season in 1977–78. The Cornhuskers, led by All-Big Eight guard Brian Banks, finished 22–8 and advanced to the second round of the NIT. By the 1979–80 season, Cipriano's failing health – he would die of cancer in November 1980 – meant he had to share coaching duties with assistant Moe Iba, and they took Nebraska to the NIT again. The duo were named co-recipients of Big Eight Coach of the Year.

Cipriano brought Nebraska into the modern era, coaching seventeen seasons and 450 games. His record of 253–197 gave him nearly one-fifth of Nebraska's all-time wins, and 168 more than any previous NU head coach.

Moe Iba (1980–86)
Iba was named head coach following Cipriano's death in November 1980. In Iba's six seasons, Nebraska was 106–71 and advanced to postseason play four times.

Center Andre Smith was the 1981 Big Eight Player of the Year and twice earned all-conference honors. However, it was Jack Moore, a 5-ft 10-in. playmaker from Muncie, Indiana, who captured the hearts of Nebraska fans in the early 1980s. Moore earned All-Big Eight honors in 1982, when he won the Frances Pomeroy Naismith Award as the nation's top player six feet tall or shorter. Moore scored 1,204 points, shot .901 from the free throw line during his career, and was NU's first three-time academic All-Big Eight selection.

The cornerstone of Iba's teams from 1983 through 1986 was Omaha native Dave Hoppen, a three-time All-Big Eight center and the first Nebraska basketball player to have his jersey number (No. 42) retired by the school. In 1982–83, Hoppen's freshman season, the Cornhuskers went 22–10 and won three games in the NIT before losing to DePaul in the semifinals. The Cornhuskers returned to the NIT each of the next two seasons, advancing to the second round both times.

Hoppen's college career was ended by a knee injury he sustained against Colorado on February 1, 1986. He finished as the school's all-time scoring leader with 2,167 points and broke or tied nineteen school records. Despite Hoppen's injury, Iba's team earned the school's first NCAA Tournament berth, where they lost to Western Kentucky 67–59 in the first round of the Southeast Regional. Before the tournament began, Iba became aware athletic director Bob Devaney was reaching out to coaches across to gauge their interest in Nebraska's coaching position. He resigned following the game.

Danny Nee (1986–2000)
On March 27, 1986, Danny Nee was introduced as Nebraska's twenty-fourth basketball coach. During his introductory press conference, Nee said a "new era" in NU basketball was beginning. Nee's fourteen teams appeared in the postseason eleven times and topped the twenty-win mark in seven seasons. In his first season, Nebraska was 21–12 and finished third in the NIT. Nebraska missed postseason play in each of the following three seasons, but won a school-record twenty-six games in 1990–91. The Cornhuskers reached the Big Eight Tournament championship game for the first time and advanced to the NCAA Tournament, where they were upset by No. 14 seed Xavier in the first round. The 1990–91 team included two future first-round NBA draft picks, senior Rich King and redshirt freshman Eric Piatkowski. The 7-ft 2-in. King was the tallest player in program history. Piatkowski, Nebraska's sixth man in 1990–91, went on to earn first-team all-conference honors twice. He ranks second on the Cornhuskers' career scoring list with 1,934 points and is the only Nebraska player to finish with at least 1,900 points, 600 rebounds (669) and 300 assists (322). In 2006, Piatkowski (No. 52) joined Hoppen and Stu Lantz (No. 22) as the only players to have their number retired.

Three more NCAA Tournament appearances followed the record-breaking 1991 season. In 1992–93, the Huskers tied for second place in the Big Eight, their highest league finish under Nee. In addition to reaching a fourth consecutive NCAA Tournament and recording back-to-back twenty-win seasons for the first time in school history, Nee's 1993–94 team won the school's first conference tournament title. The Cornhuskers defeated Oklahoma, Missouri, and Oklahoma State to win the Big Eight Tournament.

Nebraska's NCAA Tournament run ended at four in 1994–95, but the Cornhuskers kept their postseason streak alive with an NIT berth, advancing to the second round. The 1995–96 team again failed to reach the NCAA Tournament, but capped its season with a run to the NIT title. NU won two games on the road and scored more than eighty points in four of their five postseason games, finishing with a 60–56 victory over St. Joseph's. The 1996 NIT championship team was one of the most talented in school history. Two future NBA players, Erick Strickland and 1998 first-round draft pick Tyronn Lue, started in the backcourt. Two others scored 1,000 career points, Jaron Boone and freshman Venson Hamilton, who finished his career in 1999 as the school's all-time leading rebounder and shot-blocker. Lue, a six-foot point guard, finished his career as the seventh-leading scorer in school history, and ranked in the top ten in twelve other categories. He led the Cornhuskers to the 1997 NIT in Nebraska's first season in the Big 12 Conference.

Behind Nebraska's longest conference winning streak in twenty years, Nee's twelfth team at NU finished fourth in the Big 12 and returned to the NCAA Tournament. The bid was the Cornhuskers' fifth during the 1990s and extended a school-record postseason streak to eight years. The streak reached nine in 1999 when Big 12 Player of the Year Venson Hamilton led the Cornhuskers to the second round of the NIT. The 1999–2000 season quickly fell apart when guard Cookie Belcher was sidelined by a wrist injury; the team finished 11–19 and tied the school record for losses in a season. Nee was fired just days after a 69–64 win over Colorado made him the winningest coach in school history.

Barry Collier (2000–06)
Director of Athletics Bill Byrne hired Barry Collier as the Cornhuskers' new coach on April 5, 2000. In Collier's first season, Nebraska finished 14–16 as Belcher returned to the lineup and earned second-team All-Big 12 honors. He finished his career with 353 steals, the third-most in NCAA history. In Collier's fourth season, Nebraska finished 18–13 and earned its first postseason bid in five years. Nebraska won its first two games in the 2004 NIT, including a thrilling 71–70 road victory over in-state rival Creighton in the opening round. NU nearly overcame a seventeen-point halftime deficit in the third round, but lost to Hawaii by one point.

Despite a lackluster season for the program, freshman center Aleks Marić, the first Australian to play in the program, broke the NU freshman record for rebounds and double-doubles. He finished his four-year career fifth all-time in scoring and was only the second Husker to record 1,000 career rebounds. NU rebounded to finish 19–14 and make its second postseason appearance in three years in 2006, the program's most wins under Collier and the first time his Huskers won a Big 12 Tournament game. NU reached the semifinals of the conference tournament for the first time since winning the Big Eight Tournament in 1994. Collier abruptly resigned in August pf 2006 to become the athletic director at his alma mater Butler, ending his career at Nebraska with an 89–91 record.

Doc Sadler (2006–12)
The late job opening created by Collier's abrupt resignation was filled in just one week, when Doc Sadler was introduced as the twenty-sixth head coach in program history. Sadler's program saw limited success through his six seasons in Lincoln, finishing above .500 four times but winning only one postseason game and failing to reach the NCAA Tournament.

Nebraska led the Big 12 in scoring defense in Sadler's second season, allowing just 60.7 points per game. NU led the Big 12 again the following season and ranked just outside the top twenty nationally at 60.4 points against per game, the second-lowest total for NU since 1951. This allowed NU to reach .500 in conference play for the first time in ten seasons. Despite typically lackluster offensive performances, Sadler's strong defenses earned him eighty-nine victories through his first five seasons in Lincoln, the highest total in school history. He was the second NU coach to reach the postseason twice in his first three seasons and the second since World War II with three winning seasons in his first four years. Led by another strong defensive unit that ranked seventh nationally in field goal percentage against (.389), NU defeated three ranked teams during the 2010–11 season, reaching the NIT to mark the school's third postseason appearance in four seasons under Sadler.

The University of Nebraska–Lincoln joined the Big Ten Conference in 2011 and later that year the school opened the Hendricks Training Complex, a basketball training and practice facility attached to the Devaney Center. After a disappointing 12–18 season in 2011–12, athletic director Tom Osborne fired Sadler after six seasons. At the press conference to address his firing, an emotional Sadler addressed the media: "I wanted to be the guy that won the first NCAA Tournament game. It didn’t happen. That's the bottom line. We can all sit here and talk about this that whatever. It all comes down to winning. That's what it should come down to."

Tim Miles (2012–19)
Tim Miles was hired as Nebraska's head basketball coach on March 24, 2012 after a five-year stint at Colorado State. In his second season, the Cornhuskers moved to Pinnacle Bank Arena after thirty-seven years at the Devaney Center. Their first game in the new arena was an exhibition game against Nebraska-Kearney on November 4, 2013, followed four days later by their first regular season game against Florida Gulf Coast. Behind a 15–1 record at "The Vault," Miles led the Cornhuskers to the program's first NCAA Tournament berth since 1998, but NU lost to Baylor in the first round. Despite appearing in the preseason AP Poll for the first time in twenty years, Nebraska finished under .500 in 2014–15 and did not have a winning record again until 2017–18. On February 6, 2017, Nebraska suffered their worst home defeat in program history, closing the regular season with a thirty-six-point loss to Michigan. After two NIT appearances in the following seasons, Miles was fired on March 26, 2019.

Fred Hoiberg (2019–present)
On March 30, 2019, the University of Nebraska announced that Fred Hoiberg had been hired as its head coach. NU lost at least twenty games in each of Hoiberg's first three seasons, the first such seasons in program history.

Seasons

Coaches

Coaching history

Coaching staff

Rivalries

Nebraska maintains an annual intrastate rivalry with the Creighton Bluejays,. The teams have met fifty-five times and have played each season since 1977. Creighton has won twenty of the twenty-four matchups since 1999 and leads the all-time series 29–26. NU has defeated Creighton in both of their postseason matchups, in the 1984 and 2004 NIT.

Venues

Devaney Center

The Devaney Center opened in 1976 with a capacity of 13,595, replacing the Nebraska Coliseum as the primary home venue for Nebraska's basketball programs. Initially called the NU Sports Complex, it was later named for College Football Hall of Fame head coach Bob Devaney, who led Nebraska's football program to two national championships and served as athletic director for twenty-five years. Nebraska's men's team played at the Devaney Center from 1976 until 2013, compiling a record of 477–148 in its thirty-seven years at the arena. The highest attendance recorded at the arena was 15,038, a 62–54 Nebraska win over Oklahoma State on February 7, 1981. While Pinnacle Bank Arena became NU's home venue in 2013, both programs practice and train at the Hendricks Training Complex at the Devaney Center.

Pinnacle Bank Arena

Pinnacle Bank Arena, also known as "The Vault", is a 15,500-seat indoor arena in Lincoln's Haymarket District. It was completed in 2013 and replaced the Devaney Center as the home of the Nebraska's men's and women's basketball teams.

A turn back tax to support a $25 million bond for a new arena in downtown Lincoln was approved by local voters on May 11, 2010; Pinnacle Bank purchased the naming rights in a 25-year, $11.25 million agreement. The first event at the new arena was NU's 2013 summer commencement ceremony, and the first concert was held a month later when Michael Bublé performed to a sold-out crowd on September 13. Nebraska's first men's basketball game at Pinnacle Bank Arena was on November 8, 2013, a 79–55 win over FGCU. The Cornhuskers went 15–1 at Pinnacle Bank Arena in its inaugural season.

Postseason

NCAA tournament results
The Cornhuskers have appeared in the NCAA tournament seven times with a combined record of 0–7. Nebraska is the only power conference school that has never won a tournament game.

NIT results
The Cornhuskers have appeared in the National Invitation Tournament nineteen times with a combined record of 24–18. They won the tournament in 1996.

Players

Retired numbers

In the NBA
Nebraska has had 15 former men's basketball players appear in at least one NBA game.

References

 
Basketball teams established in 1897
1897 establishments in Nebraska